Orazio Antinori (28 October 1811 – 26 August 1882) was an Italian explorer and zoologist.

Antinori was born in Perugia (then in the Papal States) and studied natural history in Perugia and Rome. Afterwards he collaborated with Charles Lucien Bonaparte and illustrated Iconografia della Fauna Italica. From the middle of the 1840s he became interested in politics and worked as a journalist. In 1848 he fought against the Neapolitans with the rank of captain, and was later forced into exile. He lived in Athens and Smyrna, becoming interested in the avifauna of the area.

In 1854, he accompanied Cristina Trivulzio Belgiojoso to Syria, afterwards visiting Asia Minor. In 1859 he left for Egypt and travelled up the Nile, in 1860–1861, with Carlo Piaggia (1830-1882). He sold his ornithological collection to the natural history museum of Turin. After a long stay in Tunisia, he represented Italy at the inauguration of the Suez Canal.

SAntinori took part in the expedition of Odoardo Beccari to Ethiopia and made important collections of natural history specimens. On his return to Italy he became the secretary of the Italian Geographical Society. In 1874, Antinori studied Chott near Tunis. In 1876 he took part in an expedition with Gustavo Chiarini and Antonio Cecchi to the province of Shewa in Ethiopia where they met with Negus Menelik at Liche, and obtained his permission to found a geographical station at Let Marefia. Antinori died in Shewa.

References

1811 births
1882 deaths
Italian explorers
Italian zoologists
University of Perugia alumni
People from Perugia